Grover Cleveland Land (September 22, 1884 – July 22, 1958) was a catcher in Major League Baseball. From 1908 through 1913 he played in 95 games for the Cleveland Naps almost exclusively as a backup catcher. In 1914 and 1915 he was the primary catcher for the Brooklyn Tip-Tops of the Federal League.

Sources

1884 births
1958 deaths
Major League Baseball catchers
Cleveland Naps players
Brooklyn Tip-Tops players
Chicago Cubs coaches
Cincinnati Reds coaches
Paducah Indians players
Toledo Mud Hens players
St. Paul Saints (AA) players
Minneapolis Millers (baseball) players
Seattle Rainiers players
Baseball players from Kentucky
People from Frankfort, Kentucky